SCS Films (formerly known as Nelson Entertainment Group) is an American film company owned by  New York financier Stephen Swid.

It was responsible for the 1992 movie Mississippi Masala starring Denzel Washington.  In 1994, SCS Films was involved in a lawsuit due to a copyright infringement problem related to the movie titled Passion Fish (which was nominated for an Oscar that year).

References

External links
 SCS Films Company Details from the Media Industry
 BFI Film & TV Database

Entertainment companies established in 1992
Mass media companies established in 1992
Film production companies of the United States